Equity Bank Kenya Limited is a financial services provider headquartered in Nairobi, Kenya. It is licensed as a commercial bank by the Central Bank of Kenya, which is the central bank and national banking regulator of Kenya. In 2010 the bank introduced the Agency banking model, which has proved a success  and is regulated by Central Bank of Kenya Prudential guidelines.

History 
Equity Bank Kenya Limited was incorporated in 2014, as a result of the corporate restructure of its parent company Equity Group Holdings Limited. Prior to November 2014, Equity Group Holdings Limited operated both as a licensed bank and a holding company for its subsidiaries.

On 31 October 2014, Equity Bank announced its intention to incorporate a new, wholly owned subsidiary Equity Bank Kenya Limited, to which it would transfer its Kenyan banking business, assets and liabilities. By converting Equity Group Holdings Limited into a non-trading holding company (as defined under the Banking Act) that owns both banking and non-banking subsidiary companies and provides strategic, brand, risk and personnel management to its subsidiaries, the group would be better able to invest and develop the businesses.

During an extraordinary shareholders general meeting held on 24 November 2014, it was resolved to restructure the firm, leading to the formation of Equity Bank Kenya Limited.

Equity Bank Kenya won the most Socially Responsible Bank of the Year by the African Banker Awards for the year of 2019 and also Bank of the Year in Kenya award by The Banker for the year 2019.

According to the business daily, the bank rebranded in 2019 in a bid to do business under one brand for the next phase of growth as the bank was marking 35 years. In 2020, Equity Bank acquired Banque Commercial Du Congo (BCDC).

Ownership 
The Equity Bank Kenya Limited is wholly owned by the Equity Group Holdings, which has a customer base in excess of 14 million in six East African countries, making it one of the largest commercial banks on the African continent by number of customers.

Branch network

Equity Bank maintains a network of 190 branches across Kenya, which includes 52 branches in Nairobi.

Governance
The eight-member board of directors is chaired by Ambassador Erastus J O Mwencha. Gerald Warui, serves as the managing director of the bank.

See also
 List of banks in Kenya
 Central Bank of Kenya

References

Banks of Kenya
Banks established in 2014
Banks established in 1984
Kenyan companies established in 2014
Kenyan companies established in 1984